Rockland, Wisconsin may refer to:

Rockland, Brown County, Wisconsin, a town
Rockland, La Crosse County, Wisconsin, a village
Rockland, Manitowoc County, Wisconsin, a town